The New WKRP in Cincinnati is an American sitcom television series that aired in first-run syndication from September 7, 1991, to May 22, 1993, as a sequel to the original CBS sitcom WKRP in Cincinnati (1978–82). As with the original WKRP, MTM Enterprises produced the show.

Gordon Jump (Arthur Carlson), Frank Bonner (Herb Tarlek), and Richard Sanders (Les Nessman) reprised their roles from the original show, while Howard Hesseman reprised the role of Dr. Johnny Fever on a recurring basis (four episodes in the first season, then five in season two). Other original cast members came in for guest spots, with Loni Anderson (Jennifer Marlowe) returning for two episodes and Tim Reid (D.J. Gordon Sims/Venus Flytrap) for one episode.  Other recurring players from the original series who appeared as guests on this sequel show included Carol Bruce (Lillian "Mama" Carlson), Edie McClurg (Lucille Tarlek), Allyn Ann McLerie (Carmen Carlson) and Bill Dial (Bucky Dornster).

The week before the show's premiere, many stations carrying the program aired the hour-long WKRP in Cincinnati 50th Anniversary Special, centered on a newspaper reporter interviewing Arthur Carlson about the fictitious station's golden anniversary, which served as a setup to show clips of memorable moments from the original series.

Synopsis 
The New WKRP in Cincinnati revisits radio station WKRP, a station that had slowly climbed from near-last in the ratings to a top-10 station over the course of the original series under Program Director Andy Travis (unseen in this series). The final episode of the original series had ended on a cliffhanger, as Dr. Johnny Fever (Howard Hesseman) had convinced station owner Lillian "Mama" Carlson (Carol Bruce) not to change the station's format as she had originally planned to do, before Travis barged into the conversation drunk and collapsed on Carlson's floor. The cliffhanger was never explicitly resolved (nor Travis's ultimate fate explained), and in the nine years since, another program director, Steve "The Savage" DeMarco (also unseen), had arrived at the station. At the time of the new series' debut, general manager Arthur Carlson (Gordon Jump), Mama's son, had just fired DeMarco after DeMarco's reckless on-air antics had embroiled the station in major controversies and jeopardized the station's license with the Federal Communications Commission.

With the station's 50th anniversary approaching, Mr. Carlson hires new program director Donovan Aderhold (Mykelti Williamson) to help turn the station around. While almost all of the staff from the original series has already left in the intervening years, two long-time employees, boorish sales manager Herb Tarlek (Frank Bonner) and inept news director Les Nessman (Richard Sanders), remain.  Already at the station when Donovan arrives are DJs "the Morning Maniacs" Jack Allen (Michael Des Barres) (who previously appeared in the original series as a different character, the singer of the band "Scum of the Earth") and Dana Burns (Kathleen Garrett), whose real-life marriage is failing behind the scenes. Donovan soon also hires sexy night-time DJ Mona Loveland (Tawny Kitaen). Off the air, other staff members initially included traffic/continuity co-ordinator Claire Hartline (Hope Alexander-Willis); sporadically seen engineer Buddy Dornster (John Chapell); receptionist Ronnie Lee (Wendy Davis); and, after a few episodes, assistant sales manager Arthur Carlson, Jr. (Lightfield Lewis).

The show underwent many cast changes during its run, eventually dropping or replacing most of the initial "new" cast.  Partway through the first season, the characters of Dana Burns and Ronnie Lee were written out.  Ronnie's replacement as receptionist was spacey blonde Nancy Braithwaite (Marla Rubinoff).  Dana's character was not replaced.

After the first season, more characters were dropped:  Claire Hartline, Jack Allen and Arthur Carlson, Jr. all disappeared.  French Stewart joined the cast in the second season as morning DJ Razor D.

Dr. Johnny Fever (Howard Hesseman) made a few appearances as a guest in season 1, and participated in a four-episode story arc as WKRP's overnight DJ in season 2, although he left the station (and the series) before the season ended.  Mona Loveland was quietly written out towards the end of season 2, and does not appear in the last five episodes.  Donovan Aderhold quit the station in the next-to-last episode, and was seemingly killed off in a plane crash at the episode's conclusion.  Donovan does not appear and is not mentioned in the series finale.

A number of cast members from both old and new series wrote and directed episodes of the series. Howard Hesseman, in addition to appearing in nine episodes, directed two others in which he did not appear. Bill Dial wrote or co-wrote 13 episodes of the series, while Richard Sanders co-wrote three episodes with his wife. Frank Bonner directed five episodes, mostly in season 2, and Mykelti Williamson directed one episode. Non-cast members Asaad Kelada and Max Tash combined to direct most of the show's other episodes; among other notable non-cast members in the production staff included Burt Reynolds, Loni Anderson's then-husband, who directed one of Jennifer Marlowe's two appearances in the series in a stunt casting move, and Los Angeles conservative talk radio personality Doug McIntyre, who wrote two episodes. 

As was the case with the aforementioned Andy Travis, Bailey Quarters was completely absent from the series (in her case, her absence is explained; she had left radio many years earlier and was now a successful politician, serving as mayor of Ann Arbor, Michigan).

The show ended production in 1993 after two seasons and 47 episodes.  Only the "original three" characters of Mr. Carlson, Herb Tarlek and Les Nessman remain with the program for the entire run and are seen in every episode.

For the first several episodes, the series was still identified as WKRP in Cincinnati and used a nearly identical opening sequence to the original series, except with updated cast names. The New portion was not added to the title until later, when clips of the starring actors were added to the title sequence. The familiar opening and closing themes of its parent series were also retained, and while a new arrangement/recording was used for the opening theme, the closing theme was the same version heard on the original series (although a bit faster).

The series followed up on some details left unaddressed in the original series. For example, the actual frequency of WKRP was never revealed in the original series. (Promos for the original series had noted, without specifying a frequency, that the station used the highest available frequency on the AM dial (at the time, before the AM expanded band was opened, this was 1610 AM, used only in the U.S. for noncommercial travelers' information stations.) In this version, the station is identified as being at 1530 AM, the actual home of WCKY, also licensed to Cincinnati, though the actual 1530 AM is a 50,000-watt class A clear channel frequency, while WKRP's coverage map promoted the station as a 5,000-watt Class B station (with the exception of the original series pilot, in which the station was also at 50,000 watts).

Also addressed is why the station is in the same position as the original series, which was supposed to conclude with everyone's hard work paying off and the station reaching number six.

Main characters

Episodes

Critical reception 
Several critics of the show railed against the thought of continuing the original series, and it premiered to a mix of positive and negative reviews. Among the negative reviews from broadcast professionals was the charge that the station, broadcasting on the AM band, was still playing Rock 'n Roll music in the early 1990s, long after FM was established as the industry's leading music band.

As a syndicated program, its time slot differed in various markets. The series was able to operate in the black, but did not produce enough of a profit for investors to back it financially.

References

External links 
 

1991 American television series debuts
1993 American television series endings
1990s American sitcoms
1990s American workplace comedy television series
First-run syndicated television programs in the United States
WKRP in Cincinnati
English-language television shows
American sequel television series
Television series about radio
Television series by MTM Enterprises
Television series created by Hugh Wilson